All the Prime Minister's Men is a 2021 English investigative documentary on Bangladesh published by the Qatar-based international media Al Jazeera, alleging corruption against powerful political and military figures in Bangladesh. The documentary focuses on the past and present activities of the former Chief of Army Staff of the Bangladesh Army General Aziz Ahmed's family members and alleges various forms of corruption.

Description 

The documentary follows General Aziz Ahmed (who served as Chief of Staff of the Bangladesh Army from June 2018 till June 2021) and his three brothers' activities. Aziz's three brothers were convicted in 2004 of a murder. Among the brothers, Anis Ahmed and Haris Ahmed are currently on the run. A third brother, Tofail Ahmed Joseph, was released from prison with a presidential pardon.

Although the two brothers are on the run, the documentary shows marrying Aziz Ahmed's son in Bangladesh.  Here Anis Ahmed is shown in Kuala Lumpur, Malaysia and Haris Ahmed in Hungary's capital Budapest.

Harris Ahmed's business activities in Budapest were investigated through secret recordings. He changed his name to Hasan Mohammad and set up several businesses in different countries. In a conversation with a Bangladeshi businessman in Budapest, he is seen talking about supplying bullets to the Bangladesh Army. He also mentioned that up to Tk 5 crore was taken to get the job of Police with the connivance of the top people of the government.

According to the report, Aziz directly helped Sheikh Hasina in the 2014's and 2018's elections by the agreement of a secret mutual contract.

In a trapped secret interview by Al Jazeera, Haris said that, the chief of police Benazir Ahmed do everything according to their command.

The documents also showed that security forces imported Internet and mobile phone surveillance technology from Israel. However, Haris Ahmed was not contacted for comment.

In other video recordings, Azis's brother Haris boasts of profits he made from military contracts using his brother's power as army chief to extract bribes. The documentary also provided photographic evidence that in March 2019, Haris and Anis visited Dhaka for the wedding of Aziz's son, where the two fugitives partied alongside Bangladesh President Abdul Hamid and foreign dignitaries during an opulent ceremony.

Bangladeshi government response 
The documentary has been alleged to be defamatory by the Ministry of Foreign Affairs and Army Headquarters.
In a statement, the foreign ministry said, 
In a statement, the army headquarter of Bangladesh said,

Awards
Al Jazeera won the top prize for "Best Human Rights Journalism" (investigation category) in the 8th annual Amnesty Media award for ‘All the Prime Minister's Men’.

See also
 Al Jazeera Investigates

References

External links 
 
  
  
  
Al Jazeera Investigative Unit website

2021 films
2021 television films
2021 documentary films
Sheikh Hasina
Al Jazeera English original programming
Documentary films about Bangladesh
Political scandals in Bangladesh
Bangladesh Awami League
2020s English-language films